The 2020 ADAC 24 Hours of Nürburgring (also known as ADAC Total 24h Race at the Nürburgring Nordschleife for sponsorship reasons) was the 48th running of the 24 Hours of Nürburgring. It took place on 24–27 September 2020. Although it was previously scheduled to held on 21–23 May, it was announced on 17 March that the race would be postponed to September due to the COVID-19 pandemic.

Background
The 48th running of the 24 Hours of Nürburgring took place on 24–27 September 2020. It was previously scheduled to held on 21–23 May, but in March the race was postponed for the first time ever to September due to the COVID-19 pandemic. The qualifying race that is usually held in April was cancelled with no substitute. In July 2020 it was announced that the 24 Hours of Nurburgring would be held behind closed doors without spectators. However, just a week before the event a limited number of fans would be allowed to spectate.
The 2020 World Touring Car Cup was a support race for the 24 hours.

Entry List

Qualifying and Race results

Qualifying result
Qualifying 2 was cut short due to an accident. The top four cars from Top Qualifying 1 progressed to Top Qualifying 2. Maro Engel driving the HRT-Mercedes-AMG took pole position in top qualifying 2 and claimed the Glickenhaus Trophy. It is the third time that Mercedes and Engel have claimed pole position.

Race Result overall
At 22:33 the race was stopped due to heavy rain which resulted in poor visibility and track conditions due to standing water along with forecast of more rain. At 08:00 the next morning, some 9 and a half hours later the race was restarted with a lap behind the safety car in two groups just like the start of the race is held. This was the seventh occasion that the weather had led to the race being suspended. The Rowe Racing entry driven by Nick Catsburg, Alexander Sims and Nick Yelloly won the overall race. It was the first BMW car to win for 10 years and the 20th win for BMW in the history of the event.

Winner by Class

References 

2020
2020 in German motorsport
September 2020 sports events in Germany
Motorsport events postponed due to the COVID-19 pandemic